Vengeance is an original novel based on the U.S. television series Angel. Tagline: "The original evil is after Angel's soul."

Plot summary
L.A. is divided between the haves and the have-nots. Those in luck seem to have tanned good looks, toned bodies, riches and more. Some have-nots are beginning to grow tired of it.

Lily Pierce is a motivational speaker who founded New Life Foundation, an organization sweeping across the country. Its mantra is: "Erase doubt. Erase fear. Become pure of purpose. Perfect in execution. Attain your dreams." Cordy's not impressed with Lily's message, but she doesn't suspect Lily is holding a secret of epic proportions. 

Wolfram & Hart puzzlingly soon want Angel's help to stop the insanity, but is Lily's hope of a perfect world tempting to Angel?

Continuity
Supposed to be set in Angel season 3.

Canonical issues

Angel novels such as this one are not considered to be canon by most fans. Instead, they are novels from the authors' imaginations. However, unlike fanfic, the authors wrote 'overviews' summarizing their stories early in the writing process and had them 'approved' by both Fox and Whedon (or his office). The books were later published as official Angel merchandise.

Characters include: Angel, Cordelia, Wesley, Gunn, and Lorne.

External links
Bbc.co.uk - Interview with Dan Jolley and Scott Ciencin

Reviews
Litefoot1969.bravepages.com - Review of this book by Litefoot
Teen-books.com - Reviews of this book
Shadowcat.name - Review of this book

2002 American novels
2002 fantasy novels
Angel (1999 TV series) novels